The Pros and Cons of Hitch Hiking is the debut solo studio album by English singer and musician Roger Waters; it was released in 1984, the year before Waters announced his departure from Pink Floyd. The album was certified gold in the United States by the Recording Industry Association of America in April 1995.

Concept history and production

The concept was originally envisioned by Waters in 1977 and refined in the early 1980s. In its completed form, it rotates around a man's scattered thoughts during his midlife crisis. These are explored on a dream journey during which he takes a road trip through California, commits adultery with a hitchhiker he picks up along the way, attempts to reconcile with his wife by moving to the wilderness, and finally ends up alone but with greater insight into a common human compassion. Along the way he also faces other fears and paranoia.

The entire story is framed in real time as a fitful dream taking place in the early morning hours of 4:30:18 am to 5:12:32 am on an unspecified day. At the end of the dream, the man wakes up lonely and contrite and turns to his real wife for comfort, presumably having processed his crisis.

In July 1978, Waters presented the concepts and played demos of The Pros and Cons of Hitch Hiking as well as what was then titled Bricks in the Wall, which became The Wall, to his bandmates in the group Pink Floyd, asking them to decide which should be a group album, and which should be his solo album. After a long debate, they decided that they preferred the concept of Bricks in the Wall, even though their manager at the time, Steve O'Rourke, thought that Pros and Cons was a better-sounding concept, and David Gilmour deemed Pros and Cons stronger musically.

Waters declared:

Bricks in the Wall, retitled The Wall, became the next Pink Floyd album in 1979, and Waters shelved Pros and Cons. In early 1983, Waters undertook the shelved project himself. It was recorded in three London studios between February and December 1983: Olympic Studios, Eel Pie Studios and Waters' own Billiard Room, where his demos were constructed. The album features conductor Michael Kamen, actor Jack Palance, saxophonist David Sanborn and guitarist Eric Clapton. Guitar player Tim Renwick said:

Track 7, 4.50 am (Go Fishing), includes the same refrain as "The Fletcher Memorial Home" from Pink Floyd's The Final Cut: "The Fletcher Memorial Home for incurable tyrants and kings". This song also includes one of the car sounds, and the slightly changed chorus melody, from that album's "Your Possible Pasts".

"I played through some of the songs from the Pros and Cons album," Waters remarked in 1992, "and I was struck by how good they sounded. Looking back, that record dragged a little but, individually, some of the material was excellent."

Notes on real time 
The original album was released in 1984 on the traditional two-sided vinyl LP and cassette formats. In keeping with Waters' concept, there are five seconds missing between sides one and two to allow the listener to flip the record (or turn the cassette) in order to keep the second half starting at exactly 4:50 am as planned.

An unintended consequence of the album being released on CD a few years later was that this gap was lost due to continuous play, which moves the start of the second half back to 4:49:55am, and the start of the final track, 5:11am (The Moment of Clarity), back to 5:10:59am.

Further to this, Track 6 on the first side, 4:47 am (The Remains of Our Love), actually begins at 4:46:46am.

Packaging

Gerald Scarfe, who had created the album artwork and some animation for Pink Floyd's The Wall album, created all the graphics and animation for the Pros and Cons album. Its cover prompted controversy for featuring a rear-view nude photograph of model and softcore porn actress Linzi Drew. Although it was originally released with the nudity intact, subsequent editions distributed by Columbia Records censored Drew's buttocks with a black box.

Possible film
A film based on the concept was proposed, and in 1987 a press release for the Radio K.A.O.S. album claimed a film adaptation of Pros and Cons... had been completed, though nothing has been heard of it since. The screenplay was written by BBC/Radio Times Drama Award winner Pete Ward, who used excerpts from Waters' songs/lyrics from 1967 to 1987 as background to his award-winning play, Yesterday's Triumph, exploring the 20-year relationship of two close friends – one who attempts to fake mental illness to be with the other, who is an institutionalized 'catastrophic schizophrenic'. Ward was commissioned to expand the plot and characters in The Pros and Cons around the album's 42-minute real-time dream sequence based on Waters' own dreams.

A film was made in 1984 and 1985 which combined Gerald Scarfe's animations and Nicolas Roeg's live-action footage with slit-scan photography created by Peter Truckel at The Moving Picture Company. Also directed by Nicolas Roeg the film was projected on a backdrop behind the stage as the band played. Three promotional videos were also directed by Roeg. "The Pros and Cons of Hitch Hiking" features snippets of the live action material from the screen films interspersed with footage of "Shane" and other cowboy films. "Sexual Revolution" also featured screen film material interspersed with footage Waters singing the song and playing his bass. "Every Stranger's Eyes" is identical to the screen projection, except for the fact that footage of Waters is also interspersed here.

Track listing
All tracks are written by Roger Waters.

Personnel
Credits adapted from the album's liner notes.

Personnel
Roger Waters – lead vocals, rhythm guitar, bass, tape effects, production, sleeve design
Eric Clapton – lead guitar, backing vocals, Roland guitar synthesizer
Andy Bown – Hammond organ, 12-string guitar
Michael Kamen – piano, production
Raphael Ravenscroft, Kevin Flanagan, Vic Sullivan – horns
David Sanborn – saxophone
Madeline Bell, Katie Kissoon, Doreen Chanter – backing vocals
Andy Newmark – drums, percussion
Ray Cooper – percussion
The National Philharmonic Orchestra, conducted and arranged by Michael Kamen

Actors (in order of appearance)
Andy Quigley as 'Welshman in Operating Theatre'
Beth Porter as 'Wife'
Roger Waters as 'Man'
Cherry Vanilla as 'Hitch Hiker' and 'Waitress'
Manning Redwood and Ed Bishop as 'Truck Drivers'
Jack Palance as 'Hell's Angel'
Madeline Bell as 'Hell's Angel's Girlfriend'

Technical personnel
Andy Jackson – engineer
Laura Boisan – assistant engineer
Michael King – SFX boffin
Zuccarelli Labs – holophonics
Doug Sax and Mike Reese – mastering
 Gerald Scarfe – sleeve design, illustrations and lettering
Alex Henderson – photography
The Artful Dodgers – co-ordination

Chart positions

References

External links
 REG:International Roger Waters FanClub

Roger Waters albums
1984 debut albums
Concept albums
Rock operas
Albums produced by Roger Waters
Harvest Records albums
Obscenity controversies in music
List songs
Albums recorded at Olympic Sound Studios
Albums recorded in a home studio
Albums produced by Michael Kamen